Kilili can refer to:

 Kilili, Mesopotamian demon
 Gregorio Sablan